William David Garner (born 14 December 1947) is an English former footballer born in Leicester, who played in the Football League for Notts County, Southend United, Chelsea, Cambridge United and Brentford.

A bustling centre-forward, Garner started his career in local football in the Leicester area before signing professional forms with Notts County. After only two league appearances he returned to Loughborough United, then signed for Southern League club Dunstable Town, for whom he scored 25 goals, and then Bedford Town, who sold him to Southend United in November 1969, for a fee of £12,000. He scored 47 goals in 111 games for Southend, and was their top scorer and Player of the Season in 1971–72. After impressing during a League Cup match against Chelsea in 1972, he signed for the west Londoners three days later for £100,000.

Garner's time at Chelsea was hindered by the overall decline of the side, culminating in relegation to the Second Division in 1975, as well as his own injury problems and loss of form. He made a total of 119 appearances for Chelsea, scoring 36 goals. He signed for Cambridge United on a free transfer in 1978. He left Cambridge in 1980 and ended his career with stints at Chelmsford City and Brentford.

References

1947 births
Living people
Footballers from Leicester
English footballers
Association football forwards
Notts County F.C. players
Bedford Town F.C. players
Southend United F.C. players
Chelsea F.C. players
Cambridge United F.C. players
Chelmsford City F.C. players
Brentford F.C. players
English Football League players
Southern Football League players
Dunstable Town F.C. players
Loughborough United F.C. players